Serge Gainsbourg (born Lucien Ginsburg; 2 April 1928 – 2 March 1991) was a French musician, singer-songwriter, actor, author and filmmaker. Regarded as one of the most important figures in French pop, he was renowned for often provocative and scandalous releases which caused uproar in France, dividing public opinion. His artistic output ranged from his early work in jazz, chanson, and yé-yé to later efforts in rock, zouk, funk, reggae, and electronica. Gainsbourg's varied musical style and individuality make him difficult to categorise, although his legacy has been firmly established and he is often regarded as one of the world's most influential popular musicians.

His lyrical works incorporated wordplay, with humorous, bizarre, provocative, sexual, satirical or subversive overtones. Gainsbourg wrote over 550 songs, which have been covered more than 1,000 times by diverse artists.
Since his death from a second heart attack in 1991, Gainsbourg's music has reached legendary stature in France, and he has become one of the country's best-loved public figures. He has also gained a cult following all over the world with chart success in the United Kingdom and Belgium with "Je t'aime... moi non plus" and "Bonnie and Clyde", respectively.

Biography

1928–1956: Early years 
Lucien Ginsburg was born in Paris on 2 April 1928. He was the son of Jewish Russian migrants, Joseph and Olga Ginsburg, who fled to Paris via Istanbul after the 1917 Russian Revolution. Joseph Ginsburg was a classically trained musician whose profession was playing the piano in cabarets and casinos; he taught his children—Gainsbourg and his twin sister Liliane—to play the piano. Gainsbourg's childhood was profoundly affected by the occupation of France by Germany during World War II. The identifying yellow star that Jews were required to wear haunted Gainsbourg; in later years he was able to transmute this memory into creative inspiration. During the occupation, the Jewish Ginsburg family was able to make their way from Paris to Limoges, travelling under false papers. Limoges was in the Zone libre under the administration of the collaborationist Vichy government and still a perilous refuge for Jews, and it became even more dangerous after Germany occupied it in 1942. Gainsburg attended the Lycée Condorcet high school in Paris but dropped out before completing his Baccalauréat.

In 1945, Gainsbourg's (Ginsburg's) father enrolled him into Beaux-Arts de Paris, a prestigious art school, before he switched to the Académie de Montmartre, where his professors included the likes of André Lhote and Fernand Léger. There, Gainsbourg would meet his first wife Elisabeth "Lize" Levitsky, daughter of Russian aristocrats who was also a part-time model. They married on 3 November 1951 and were divorced by 1957.  In 1948, he was conscripted by the military for twelve months of service in Courbevoie. He never saw action and spent the time playing dirty songs on his guitar, visiting prostitutes and drinking, later admitting that the service made him an alcoholic. Gainsbourg obtained work teaching music and drawing in a school outside of Paris, in Le Mesnil-le-Roi. The school was set up under the auspices of local rabbis, for the orphaned children of murdered deportees. Here, Gainsbourg heard the accounts of Nazi persecution and genocide, stories that resonated for Gainsbourg far into the future.

1957–1963: Early work as a pianist and chanson singer
Gainsbourg was disillusioned as a painter, as he lacked talent. He was able to earn a living working odd jobs and as a piano player in bars, usually as a stand-in for his father. He soon became the venue pianist at the drag cabaret club Madame Arthur. Whilst filling in a form to join the songwriting society SACEM, Gainsbourg decided to change his first name to Serge, feeling that this was representative of his Jewish background and because, as his future partner Jane Birkin relates: "Lucien reminded him of a hairdresser's assistant". He chose Gainsbourg as his last name, in homage to the English painter Thomas Gainsborough, whom he admired. Gainsbourg had a revelation when he saw Boris Vian at the Milord l'Arsouille club, whose provocative and humorous songs would influence his own compositions. At the Milord l'Arsouille, Gainsbourg accompanied singer and club star Michèle Arnaud on the guitar. In 1957, Arnaud and the club's director Francis Claude discovered, with amazement, the compositions of Gainsbourg while visiting his house to see his paintings. The next day, Claude pushed Gainsbourg on stage. Despite suffering from stage fright, he performed his own repertoire, including "Le Poinçonneur des Lilas", which describes the day in the life of a Paris Métro ticket man, whose job is to stamp holes in passengers' tickets. Gainsbourg describes this chore as so monotonous, that the man eventually thinks of putting a hole into his own head and being buried in another hole. He was given his own show by Claude and was eventually spotted by Jacques Canetti, who helped propel his career with a spot at the Théâtre des Trois Baudets and on his tours. In 1958, Arnaud began recording several interpretations of Gainsbourg's songs.

His debut album, Du chant à la une !... (1958), was recorded  in the summer of 1958, backed by arranger Alain Goraguer and his orchestra, beginning a fruitful collaboration. It was released in September, becoming a commercial  and critical failure, despite winning the grand prize at L'Academie Charles Cross and the praise of Boris Vian, who compared him to Cole Porter. His next album, N° 2 (1959), suffered a similar fate. He made his film debut in 1959 with a supporting role in the French-Italian co-production Come Dance with Me, starring his future lover Brigitte Bardot. In the following year, he featured as a Roman officer in the Italian sword-and-sandals epic-film The Revolt of the Slaves. He would continue playing "nasty characters" in similar productions, including Samson (1961) and The Fury of Hercules (1962). Gainsbourg's first commercial success came in 1960 with his single "L'Eau à la bouche", the title song from the film of the same name, for which he had composed the score. L'Étonnant Serge Gainsbourg (1961), his third LP, included what would become one his best known songs from this period, "La Chanson de Prévert", which lifted lyrics from the Jacques Prévert poem  "Les feuilles mortes". After a night of drinking champagne and dancing with singer Juliette Gréco, Gainsbourg went home and wrote "La Javanaise" for her. They would both release versions of the song in 1962, but it is Gainsbourg's rendition that has endured. His fourth album, Serge Gainsbourg N° 4 was released in 1962, incorporating Latin and rock and roll influences whilst his next, Gainsbourg Confidentiel (1963), featured a more minimalistic jazz approach, accompanied only by a double bass and electric guitar.

1963–1966: Eurovision and involvement in the yé-yé movement  

Despite initially mocking yé-yé, a style of French pop typically sung by young female singers, Gainsbourg would soon become one of its most important figures after writing a string of hits for artists like Brigitte Bardot, Petula Clark and France Gall. He had met Gall after being introduced by a friend as they were Philips Records labelmates, thus beginning a successful collaboration that would produce hits like "N'écoute pas les idoles", the frequently covered "Laisse tomber les filles", and "Poupée de cire, poupée de son", the latter of which was the Luxembourgian winning entry at the Eurovision Song Contest 1965. Inspired by the 4th movement (Prestissimo in F minor) from Beethoven's Piano Sonata No. 1, the song featured double entendres  and wordplay, a staple of Gainsbourg's lyrics. The controversially risqué "Les sucettes" ("Lollipops"), featured references to oral sex, unbeknownst to the 18-year-old Gall, who thought the song was about lollipops. Gall later expressed displeasure at Gainsbourg's antics, stating she felt "betrayed by the adults around me" in 2001.

Gainsbourg married a second time on 7 January 1964, to Françoise-Antoinette "Béatrice" Pancrazzi, with whom he had two children: a daughter named Natacha (b. 8 August 1964) and a son, Paul (born in spring 1968). He divorced Béatrice in February 1966.

His next album, Gainsbourg Percussions (1964), was inspired by the rhythms and melodies of African musicians Miriam Makeba and Babatunde Olatunji. Olatunji later sued Gainsbourg for lifting three tracks from his 1960 album Drums of Passion. Nevertheless, the album has been hailed as being ahead of its time for its incorporation of world music and lyrical content depicting interracial love. Between 1965 and 1966, Gainsbourg composed the music and sung the words of science fiction writer André Ruellan for several songs made for a series of animated Marie-Mathematics shorts created by Jean-Claude Forest. He would reunite with Michèle Arnaud for the duet "Les Papillons noirs" from her 1966 comeback record.

1967–1970: Famous muses and duets  

In 1967, Gainsbourg wrote the script and provided the soundtrack for the musical comedy television film Anna starring Anna Karina in the titular role. Another Gainsbourg song, "Boum-Badaboum" by  Minouche Barelli, was entered by Monaco in the Eurovision Song Contest 1967, coming in fifth place. In that year, Gainsbourg would have a brief but ardent love affair with Brigitte Bardot. One day she asked him to write the most beautiful love song he could imagine and, that night, he wrote the duets "Je t'aime... moi non plus" and "Bonnie and Clyde" for her. The erotic yet cynical  "Je t'aime", describing the hopelessness of physical love, was recorded by the pair in a small glass booth in Paris. But after Bardot's husband, German businessman Gunter Sachs, became aware of the recording, he demanded it be withdrawn. Bardot pleaded with Gainsbourg not to release it, and he complied.

Bardot's LP Brigitte Bardot Show 67 contained four songs penned by Gainsbourg, including duets such as the playful "Comic Strip" and the string-laden "Bonnie and Clyde", which tells the story of the American criminal couple and was based on a poem written by Bonnie Parker herself. His own Initials B.B. (1968) included these duets and was his first album in nearly four years. It blended orchestral pop with the style of rock characteristic of London in the swinging sixties, where the album was largely recorded. Gainsbourg borrowed heavily from  Antonín Dvořák's New World Symphony for the title track, named after and dedicated to Bardot. Phillips subsidiary Fontana Records also issued the compilation LP Bonnie and Clyde (1968) comprising their duets and other previously recorded material.

His percussion-heavy 1968 single "Requiem pour un con" was performed onscreen by Gainsbourg in the crime film Le Pacha, for which he was the composer. Shortly after being left by Bardot, Gainsbourg was asked by Françoise Hardy to write a French version of the song "It Hurts to Say Goodbye". The result was "Comment te dire adieu", which is notable for its uncommon rhymes and has become one of Hardy's signature songs.

In mid-1968 Gainsbourg fell in love with the younger English singer and actress Jane Birkin, whom he met during the shooting of the film Slogan (1969). In the film, Gainsbourg starred as a commercial director who has an affair on his pregnant wife with a younger woman, played by Birkin. Gainsbourg also provided the soundtrack and dueted with Birkin on the title theme "La Chanson de Slogan". The relationship would last for over a decade. In July 1971 they had a daughter, Charlotte, who would become an actress and singer. Although many sources state that they were married, according to Charlotte this was not the case.  After filming Slogan, Gainsbourg asked Birkin to re-record "Je t'aime..." with him. Her vocals were an octave higher than Bardot's, contained suggestive heavy breathing and culminated in simulated orgasm sounds. Released in February 1969, the song topped the UK Singles Chart after being temporarily banned due to its overtly sexual content. It was banned from the radio in several other countries, including Spain, Sweden, Italy and France before 11pm. The song was even publicly denounced by The Vatican. It was included on the joint album Jane Birkin/Serge Gainsbourg, which also contained "Élisa" and new recordings of songs written by other artists including "Les sucettes", "L'anamour" and "Sous le soleil exactement". In 2017, Pitchfork named it the 44th best album of the 1960s. He and Birkin would share the screen in another Gainsbourg-scored film, Cannabis (1970), in which he played an American gangster who falls in love with a girl from a wealthy family.

1971–1977: Concept albums 

Following the success of "Je t'aime... moi non plus", his record company had expected Gainsbourg to produce another hit. But after having already made a fortune, he was uninterested, deciding to "move onto something serious". The result was his 1971 concept album Histoire de Melody Nelson, which tells the story of an illicit relationship between the narrator and the teenage Melody Nelson after running her over in his Rolls-Royce Silver Ghost. The album heavily features Gainsbourg's distinctive half-spoken, half-sung vocal delivery, loose drums, guitar, and bass evoking funk music, and lush string and choral arrangements by Jean-Claude Vannier. Despite only selling around 15,000 copies upon release, it has become highly influential and is often considered his magnum opus. An accompanying television special starring Gainsbourg and Birkin was also broadcast.

He suffered a heart attack in May 1973, but refused to cut back on his smoking and drinking. Gainsbourg's next record Vu de l'extérieur (1973) was not strictly a concept album like its predecessor and follow-ups, despite its focus on scatology throughout. It largely failed to connect with critics and listeners. In that year, Gainsbourg also wrote all of the tracks on Birkin's debut solo album Di doo dah and he would continue to write for her until his death. In 1975, Gainsbourg released the darkly comic album Rock Around the Bunker, performed in an upbeat 1950s rock and roll style and written on the subject of Nazi Germany and the Second World War, drawing from his experiences as a Jewish child in occupied France. The next year saw the release of yet another concept album, L'Homme à tête de chou (The Cabbage Head Man), a nickname used by Gainsbourg himself in reference to his large ears. It included his first foray into the Jamaican genre reggae, a style that Gainsbourg would record his next two albums in.

In 1976, Gainsbourg also made his directorial debut with Je t'aime moi non plus, an offbeat drama named after his song of the same name. It starred Birkin in the lead role, with American actor Joe Dallesandro playing the gay man she falls in love with. The film received positive critical notices from the French press and acclaimed director François Truffaut. Having previously turned down the offer to score the popular softcore pornography film Emmanuelle (1974), he agreed to do so for one of its sequels Goodbye Emmanuelle in 1977.

1978–1981: Reggae period 

In 1978, Gainsbourg dropped plans to record another concept album and contacted several Jamaican musicians including rhythm section players Sly and Robbie with the intention of recording a reggae album. He set off for Kingston, Jamaica in September to begin recording Aux armes et cætera (1979) with the likes of Sly and Robbie and the female backing singers The I-Threes of Bob Marley and the Wailers; thus making him the first white musician to record such an album in Jamaica. The album was immensely popular, achieving platinum status for selling over one million copies. But it was not without controversy, as the title track—a reggae version of the French national anthem "La Marseillaise"—received harsh criticism in the newspaper Le Figaro from Michel Droit, who condenmed the song and opined that it may cause a rise in anti-semitism. Gainsbourg also received death threats from right-wing veteran soldiers of the Algerian War of Independence, who were opposed to their national anthem being arranged in reggae style. In 1979, a show had to be cancelled, because an angry mob of French Army parachutists came to demonstrate in the audience. Alone onstage, Gainsbourg raised his fist and answered: "The true meaning of our national anthem is revolutionary" and sang it a capella with the audience.

Birkin left Gainsbourg in 1980, but the two remained close, with Gainsbourg becoming the godfather of Birkin and Jacques Doillon's daughter Lou and writing her next three albums. His first live album Enregistrement public au Théâtre Le Palace (1980), exhibited his reggae-influenced style at the time. Also in 1980, Gainsbourg dueted with actress Catherine Deneuve on the hit song "Dieu fumeur de havanes"  from the film Je vous aime and published a novella entitled Evguénie Sokolov, the tale of an avant-garde painter who exploits his flatulence by creating a style known as "gasograms". His final reggae recording, Mauvaises nouvelles des étoiles (1981), was recorded at Compass Point Studios in The Bahamas with the same personnel as its predecessor. Bob Marley, husband to The I Threes singer Rita Marley, was reportedly furious when he discovered that Gainsbourg had made his wife Rita sing erotic lyrics. New posthumous dub mixes of Aux armes et cætera and Mauvaises Nouvelles des Étoiles were released in 2003. During this period, Gainsbourg also had success writing material for other artists, mostly notably "Manureva" for Alain Chamfort, a tribute to French sailor Alain Colas and the titular trimaran he disappeared at sea with.

1982–1991: Final years and death 

In 1982, Gainsbourg contributed his songwriting to French rockstar Alain Bashung's album Play blessures, which was a left turn creatively for Bashung and is often considered a cult classic despite negative contemporary reviews. His second film as a director, Équateur (1983), was adapted from the 1933 novel Tropic Moon by Belgian writer Georges Simenon and is set in colonialist French Equatorial Africa.

Love on the Beat (1984) saw Gainsbourg move on from reggae and onto a more electronic, new wave inspired sound. The album is known for addressing taboo sexual subject matters, with Gainsbourg dressed in drag on the cover and the highly controversial duet with his daughter Charlotte, "Lemon Incest", which seemed to ambiguously refer to the impossible physical love between an adult and his child. The music video for the song featured a half-naked Gainsbourg lying on a bed with Charlotte, leading to further controversy. Nevertheless, it was Gainsbourg's highest-charting song in France. In March 1984, he  illegally burned three-quarters of a 500-French-franc bill on television to protest against taxes rising up to 74% of income. In April 1986, on Michel Drucker's live Saturday evening television show Champs-Élysées, with the American singer Whitney Houston, he objected to Drucker's translating his comments to Houston and, in English, stated: "I said, I want to fuck her"—Drucker, utterly embarrassed, insisted that this meant "He says you are great..." That same year, in another talk show interview, he appeared alongside Les Rita Mitsouko singer Catherine Ringer. Gainsbourg spat out at her, "You're nothing but a filthy whore" to which Ringer replied, "look at you, you're just a bitter old alcoholic...you've become a disgusting old parasite."

Gainsbourg's final partner until his death was the model Caroline Paulus, better known by her stage name Bambou. They had a son, Lucien (b. 5 January 1986), who now goes by the name Lulu and is a musician. His 1986 film Charlotte for Ever further expanded on the themes found in "Lemon Incest". He starred in the film alongside Charlotte as a widowed, alcoholic father living with his daughter.  An album of the same name by Charlotte was also written by Gainsbourg.

His sixteenth and final studio album, You're Under Arrest (1987), largely retained the funky new wave sound of Love on the Beat, but also introduced hip hop elements. A return to concept albums for Gainsbourg, it tells the story of an unnamed narrator and his drug-addicted girlfriend in New York City. The album's anti-drug message was exemplified by the single "Aux enfants de la chance".

In December 1988, while a judge at a film festival in Val d'Isère, he was extremely intoxicated at a local theatre where he was to do a presentation. While on stage he began to tell an obscene story about Brigitte Bardot and a champagne bottle, only to stagger offstage and collapse in a nearby seat. Subsequent years saw his health deteriorate, undergoing liver surgery in April 1989. In his ill health, he retired to a private apartment in Vézelay in July 1990, where he would spend six months. He continued to write for other artists, including the lyrics to "White and Black Blues" by Joëlle Ursull, the French entry in the Eurovision Song Contest 1990, coming in second place. He similarly wrote all of the lyrics for  popular singer Vanessa Paradis's album Variations sur le même t'aime (1990), declaring "Paradis is hell" after its release. His final film, Stan the Flasher, starred Claude Berri as an English teacher who engages in exhibitionism. Gainsbourg's last album of original material was Birkin's Amours des feintes in 1990.

Gainsbourg, who smoked five packs of unfiltered Gitane cigarettes a day, died from a heart attack at his home on 2 March 1991, a month shy of his 63rd birthday. He was buried in the Jewish section of the Montparnasse Cemetery in Paris. French President François Mitterrand paid tribute by saying, "He was our Baudelaire, our Apollinaire ... He elevated the song to the level of art."

Legacy and influence 

Since his death, Gainsbourg's music has reached legendary stature in France. In his native country, artists like the bands Air, Stereolab and BB Brunes (who named themselves after Gainsbourg's song "Initials B.B."), singers Benjamin Biolay, Vincent Delerm, Thomas Fersen and Arthur H have cited him as an influence. He has also gained a following in the English-speaking world from artists like Jarvis Cocker of Pulp, Beck, Michael Stipe of R.E.M., Alex Turner of Arctic Monkeys, Portishead, Massive Attack, Mike Patton of Faith No More and Neil Hannon of The Divine Comedy. Nick Cave and the Bad Seeds guitarist Mick Harvey has recorded four cover albums sung in English. Gainsbourg's music has been sampled by several hip hop artists, including songs by Nas, Wu-Tang Clan, Busta Rhymes and MC Solaar.

The Parisian house in which Gainsbourg lived from 1969 until 1991, at 5 bis Rue de Verneuil, remains a celebrated shrine, with his ashtrays and collections of various items, such as police badges and bullets, intact. The outside of the house is covered in graffiti dedicated to Gainsbourg, as well as with photographs of significant figures in his life, including Bardot and Birkin. In 2008, Paris' Cité de la Musique held the Gainsbourg 2008 exhibition, curated by sound artist Frédéric Sanchez.

Comic artist Joann Sfar wrote and directed the biographical film of his life Gainsbourg (Vie héroïque) (2010). Gainsbourg is portrayed by Eric Elmosnino as an adult and Kacey Mottet Klein as a child. The film won three César Awards, including Best Actor for Elmosnino, and was nominated for an additional eight.

Hong Kong indie-pop band My Little Airport made reference to him in a song on their 2012 album "Lonely Friday" (寂寞的星期五) called "how can you fall in love with a guy who doesn’t know Gainsbourg?"

Discography

Studio albums
 Du chant à la une !... (1958)
 N° 2 (1959)
 L'Étonnant Serge Gainsbourg (1961)
 Serge Gainsbourg N° 4 (1962)
 Gainsbourg Confidentiel (1964)
 Gainsbourg Percussions (1964)
 Initials B.B. (1968)
 Jane Birkin/Serge Gainsbourg (1969)
 Histoire de Melody Nelson (1971)
 Vu de l'extérieur (1973)
 Rock Around the Bunker (1975)
 L'Homme à tête de chou (1976)
 Aux armes et cætera (1979)
 Mauvaises nouvelles des étoiles (1981)
 Love on the Beat (1984)
 You're Under Arrest (1987)

Notes and references

Notes

References

Sources

External links 

  Serge Gainsbourg official site
 
 

 
1928 births
1991 deaths
20th-century accordionists
20th-century bass guitarists
20th-century French male actors
20th-century French male pianists
Alumni of the Académie de la Grande Chaumière
Birkin family
Burials at Montparnasse Cemetery
Cabaret singers
Controversies in France
Television controversies in France
Eurovision Song Contest winners
French accordionists
French contemporary artists
French disco singers
French film directors
French jazz singers
French Jews
French-language film directors
French male jazz musicians
French multi-instrumentalists
French people of Russian-Jewish descent
French poets
French pop guitarists
French male guitarists
French pop singers
French reggae musicians
French rock singers
French male singer-songwriters
Jewish French male actors
Jewish poets
Jewish singers
Jewish songwriters
Male actors from Paris
Philips Records artists
Mercury Records artists
Musicians from Paris
Lycée Condorcet alumni
Pop pianists
French twins
Universal Records artists
20th-century French male singers